von Saltza is a surname. Notable people with the surname include:

Anton von Saltza (1843–1916), Russian general
Carl Frederick von Saltza (1858–1905), Swedish-American artist and portrait painter
Chris von Saltza (born 1944), American swimmer
Philip von Saltza (1885–1980), Swedish-born American artist and muralist
 Anna Catharina, baroness von Saltza (b. 1981), wife of Prince Friedrich Wilhelm of Prussia (b. 1979)